Radu Tudoran (born Nicolae Bogza; March 8, 1910 – November 18, 1992) was a popular Romanian novelist.

After graduating from the military high school at Dealu Monastery in 1930, and the military academy from Sibiu in 1932, he served as an officer in the Romanian Land Forces until 1938. He also translated books from French and Russian.

He died of heart disease brought by arteriosclerosis at Fundeni Hospital, în Bucharest.

Streets in Cluj-Napoca and Timișoara are named after him; middle schools in Blejoi and Brăila also bear his name.

References

External links 

 Radu Tudoran Biography

1910 births
1992 deaths
People from Blejoi
Romanian male novelists
Romanian children's writers
Romanian translators
Romanian Land Forces officers
20th-century translators
20th-century Romanian novelists
20th-century Romanian male writers
Deaths from arteriosclerosis